Ighraa (Arabic: إغراء), also is known as Igraa, (January 19, 1945) is a Syrian actress and belly dancer who reached her fame mostly in Syrian cinema of the 1970s.

Born Nihad Alaeddin (Arabic: نهاد علاء الدين), she left her native Syria with her elder sister for Egypt in 1958. Trained under famous Egyptian belly dancer Tahiya Karioka, she was given the stage name Ighraa ("Temptation"). After appearing in various films and TV dramas in Egypt and later in Syria, she made her acting breakthrough with The Leopard (الفهد) by Nabil Maleh released in 1972. Her scenes in the film were considered transgressive and caused widespread criticism, which was followed box office success. After films such as Al-Mughamara (1974) and into the late 1970s, she chose a lower profile but has remained a symbol of "openness and liberalism that reigned in the Arab world during the 1960s and 70s."

References

External links
Ighraa at ElCinema
 

Syrian film actresses
Syrian female dancers
Belly dancers
1945 births
Living people
People from Damascus
20th-century Syrian actresses